Mark Fiore may refer to:

 Mark Fiore (cartoonist) (born 1970), American cartoonist
 Mark Fiore (footballer) (born 1969), English footballer